Henri Mata (born 26 April 1986) is a professional Albanian footballer who played as a midfielder for KS Burreli in the Albanian First Division, where he also was the club captain.

References

1986 births
Living people
People from Mat (municipality)
Albanian footballers
Association football midfielders
KS Burreli players
Kategoria e Parë players